In Greek mythology, Philodice or Philodike (Ancient Greek: Φιλοδίκη) was the name of the following figures: 
 Philodice, an Argive naiad, daughter of Inachus, river-king of Argos. She was the wife of Leucippus of Messenia by whom she became the mother of Hilaeira, Phoebe and possibly Arsinoe. Philodice was possibly the sister of Phoroneus, Io and Aegialeus.
 Philodice, wife of Magnes, king of Macedonia and mother of his sons, Eurynomus and Eioneus. Otherwise the wife of Magnes was called Meliboea by Eustathius.

Notes 

Naiads
Nymphs
Children of Inachus
Princesses in Greek mythology
Queens in Greek mythology
Argive characters in Greek mythology
Mythology of Argolis